North Carolina's 23rd Senate district is one of 50 districts in the North Carolina Senate. It has been represented by Democrat Graig Meyer since 2023.

Geography
Since 2023, the district has included all of Orange, Caswell, and Person counties. The district overlaps with the 2nd, 50th, and 56th state house districts.

District officeholders

Election results

2022

2020

2018

2016

2014

2012

2010

2008

2006

2004

2002

2000

References

North Carolina Senate districts
Orange County, North Carolina
Caswell County, North Carolina
Person County, North Carolina